Hamlet Abdulla oglu Isayev (born March 1, 1948) is an Azerbaijani mathematician, historian of science and culture, writer, founder of Khazar University who served as University president from April 1991 to September 2010. He is currently the Chairman of the Board of Directors and Trustees, founder of Dunya School, and founder of a publishing house (all in Baku, capital of Azerbaijan) as well as a   translator   of poetry, lecturer, and editor. He is a founding member of the Eurasian Academy.

Hamlet Isakhanli is his penname that he uses as a poet and in his publications in the fields of humanities and social sciences. All his works in mathematics have been published under the surname Isayev, he is better known among the general public as Hamlet Isakhanli.

Hamlet Isakhanli's academic and literary works cover a broad range of fields including research in mathematics and many areas of humanities and the social sciences, poetry, and creative writing.

Biography 
Isakhanli finished high school with a gold medal and was admitted to the Faculty of Mechanics and Mathematics of Azerbaijan State University in 1965. He graduated from BSU in 1970 with honors. In the same year, he was admitted back to the postgraduate research course of the institute, and then sent to Lomonosov Moscow State University for his graduate education and research. In 1973, he received a Ph.D. degree in Physical-Mathematical sciences.

From 1973 to 1983, he worked as professor at Azerbaijan State Institute of Oil and Chemistry (currently Azerbaijan State Oil Academy) and chaired the department of mathematics in the Baku campus of the Leningrad Institute of Economics and Finance.

He was married to Naila Isayeva.

Research 
Hamlet Isakhanli is a scholar who has carried out research in various fields of sciences and arts.

Hamlet Isakhanli is one of the authors and co-editor of the Khazar English-Azerbaijani Comprehensive Dictionary in six volumes. This work has been completed for the most part; its first three volumes have already been published.

Hamlet Isakhanli discusses in his writings the problems of poetry and philosophy. political science and international relations,  history, journalism,  etc.

Poetry 
Hamlet Isakhanli is also well known and respected in Azerbaijan and other countries as a poet.

He translated poetry from English, Russian and French into Azerbaijani, particularly the poems of George Gordon Byron, W. Blake, Robert Herrick, and Gérard de Nerval, Vasily Zhukovsky, Evgeny Baratynsky, Fyodor Tyutchev, Afanasy Fet, Sergei Yesenin, Nikolay Gumilev, Anna Akhmatova, and Alla Akhundova.

Many of his lyric poems have been used for composing songs and musical spectacles.

Reforms in education 
Isakhanli was interested in educational organizations in the West. In the late 1980s, Isakhanli tried to explain the educational crisis in the Soviet and Azerbaijani and tried to find solutions which he published in Azerbaijani and Russian newspapers and on the radio and TV.

Khazar University (foundation and principles) 

Khazar University (then called Azerbaijan University of the English Language) was established on March 18, 1991. The university was the first private university established in Azerbaijan and one of the first officially established in the post-Soviet era

It differentiates from other universities with its Western-type curricula and study programs, adoption of a flexible credit accumulation system and student-centered model of education, application of modern methods of management, establishment of broad and effective international relations, high-quality local and foreign specialists.

Dunya School and Training Center 
Dunya School, established by Hamlet Isakhanli in 1998 and affiliated with Khazar University, providing the preschool, primary, secondary, and high school levels with bilingual education in Azerbaijani and English.

As of January 16, 2009, the school gained the status of an IBO school and offers the IB Diploma Program to its students in the last two years of high school.

Kin 
Hamlet Isakhanli is a member of the Hajibayramli clan. His grandfather was guerilla Isakhan Hajibayramli (1897–1930), who organized an armed rebellion against the Soviets in the late 1920s to 1930, in the territories of Georgia and Armenia. His 100-year anniversary was celebrated in both Azerbaijan and Georgia.

Awards 
2010 – National "Khazar" Award, in recognition of contribution to the development of Azerbaijani Education and to founding a university which meets international standards

Naila Isayeva

Nailekhanim Isayeva (29 May 1947 – 3 April 2021) born Nailə Asgarli was an Azerbaijani pedagogue-organizer and songwriter born in Quba. She was co-founder of Khazar University and Dunya School, together with her husband Hamlet Isakhanli. She was a teacher, pedagogue, composer, manager, and founding director of Dünya School until 2010. In 2011 she became chair-person of the Dunya School`s board, and advisor in Humanitarian and Organisational Affairs to the Board of Directors and Trustees of Khazar University. Isayeva died in Baku on 3 April 2021, aged 73, from cancer. Khazar University Board of Directors and Trustees took steps to perpetuate Ms. Naila's memory:

 The Nailakhanim Foundation and the Nailakhanim Scholarship was established (to offer full scholarship for girls and women from all countries determined to pursue master and / or doctoral degrees)
 The Nailakhanim Museum was established at the Dünya School.
 A bust of Nailakhanim at Khazar was installed at the University and the Dünya School.

Composer Sardar Farajov created "Elegy" in memory of Nailekhanım. It was  performed for the first time at Uzeyir Hajibeyli XIII International Music Festival, Baku on 22 September 2021. On November 12, 2021, the first presentation of the Nailakhanim Scholarship, established by the Nailakhanim Foundation, took place in the Marble Hall of Khazar University. The book "Nailakhanim in Memories" edited by Hamlet Isaxanli is published by Khazar University Publishing House. The book reflects people's memories about Nailakhanim.

References

 "The Life of the Scholar And Founder" by Fuad Tanriverdiyev, Baku, 1997.(in Azerbaijani)
 "What I Brought To This World" by Knyaz Aslan and Vahid Omarli, Baku, 2005 (in Azerbaijani and Russian).
 "In Search of Khazar" by Hamlet Isakhanli, Baku, 2006 (in English, Azerbaijani and Russian).
 "On the Education System in Transition Economy. A View From Azerbaijan" by Hamlet Isakhanli, Baku, 2006.
  Emily Van Buskirk, "Current Trends in Education in Azerbaijan - A discussion with Professor Hamlet Isakhanli", Caspian Studies Program, Harvard University, April 25, 2001, Accessed on April 14, 2006.
  Hamlet Isakhanli - Assembly of Science and Art. 1-10. Khazar University Press, Baku, 2008 (in Azerbaijani)
  http://www.hisaxanli.org
Khazar University
  Lyudmila Lavrova. "An invitation to traveling to the poetry world - "Contrasts"". Preface to the book by Hamlet Isakhanli, published in Moscow in Russian:
  Гамлет Исаханлы  «Контрасты». Kнигa cтихотворений" (В переводах Аллы Ахундовой). "ИзoгpaфЪ", Москва, 2006).
  The Social and Political Context of Sovietization and Collectivization Period in the Central Transcaucasia and Isakhan Revolt (in Azeri) / Proceedings of the Conference "Socio-political Thought of the XX century". Baku, May 12, 1996. – Baku: Khazar University Press, 1996. – p. 1-16.
Also // Georgia newspaper. – Tbilisi. – 1996. – No 34-42.
Also // Khalg newspaper. – Baku. – 1996. – No 148-150.
  Fragments From the History of Thought and Education  (in Azeri) // Khazar View, 1998–1999. No 57-64.
  Negotiations on Nagorno-Karabagh: where do we go from here? / Summary and transcript from a Panel Discussion held on April 23, 2001. Caspian Studies’ Program, John F. Kennedy School of Government, Harvard University.
  Minority Education Policy in Azerbaijan and Iran / Hamlet Isakhanli, Val D. Rust, Afgan Abdullayev, Marufa Madatova, Inna Grudskaya, Younes Vahdati // Journal of Azerbaijani Studies. – 2002. – Vol. 5. – No 3–4. – p. 3–78.
  Karakmazli, D. Taste of a Fig: Poems and Translations. Baku: Uyurd, 2005./Poems of Hamlet Isakhanli translated from Azeri into Russian – pp. 180–190.
  Perspectives on the United States (Hamlet Isakhanli, Anar Ahmadov) in "Global Perspectives on the United States: a Nation by Nation Survey". Vol. 1. – Great Barrington: Berkshire Publishing Group, 2007. – p. 31-33.
  Hamlet Isakhanli. What is Happening in the Modern World in the Field of Higher Education and How "The State Program to Reform the Higher Education System of the Azerbaijan Republic for the period of 2008-2012" May Best be Carried Out? (in Azeri). Khazar University Press, Baku, Azerbaijan, 2008.
  An Interesting Person (in Azeri) / Interview was led by X. Macidoglu // 525 newspaper. – 2008. –January 29 (No 15). – p. 4.
  Hamlet Isakhanli: "A creative person desires neither his house be high, nor his name..." /Interview with Hamlet Isakhanli (in Azeri) // 525 newspaper. – 2008. – October 11 (No.187). – p. 20.
  Nagiyev R. Formula of Vengeance (in Azeri) // Kommunist. – 1987. – July 2. – p. 6.
  Odinets V. At the Universities of Canada (in Russian) // Sovetskiy Ekonomist. – 1989. – January 27. – p. 4.
  Hamlet Isayev (Issakhanly) // Who's Who in the Former Soviet Union. – Surrey, England: Debrett's Peerage, Ltd., 1994. – p. 22-23.
  Seyidova I. "Khazar" - is a Lake which Can be Called a Sea (in Russian) // Consulting and Business. – Baku. – 1996. – p. 82-83.
  Who Dedicates Himself to Work and Regards it as a Field of Creativity will Never be Exhausted and Become Discouraged ... (in Azeri) / Interview was led by V. Omarov // Khazar View – 1997. – No 32. – p. 3-5.
  Mustafayev C. Poetry Gets Mingled with Intellect (A foreword to Hamlet Isakhanli's book "Contrasts") (in Azeri). – Baku: Khazar University Press, 2001. – 15 p.
  Suleymanli M. Inner Expression of the Great Word (in Azeri) // 525 newspaper – 2002. – September 3. – p. 7.
and Hemistichs Taking Reader Together: While Reading the Book "Contrasts" by Hamlet Isakhanli (in Azeri) // Khazar View. – 2002. – September 15 (No 129). – p. 6-9.
  Nazirli K. Poetic World of the Well-known Scholar. On Hamlet Isakhanli's Book "Contrasts" (in Azeri) // Khazar View. – 2003.– No 152. – p. 14-15.
  Metin Turan. New Azerbaijan Poetry and Hamlet Isakhanli (in Turkish) // LİTTERA. Edebiyat Yazıları. – Ankara. – 2004. – v.14. – p. 163-168. Also (in Azeri) // 525 newspaper. – 2005. – June 28. – p. 7.
  A Spouse of "Contrasts" Author and the Target of the "Emotions Turned out into Poetry" (in Azeri) / Inter¬view was led by S. Gulten // "Qadin Dunyasi" newspaper. – 2004. – November 5–18 (No 21). – p. 9
  Nazirli K. Hamlet Isakhanli's Sensitive Poetry (in Aze¬ri) // Khazar View. – 2005. – November 1 (No 196). – p. 21-23.
Also // 525 newspaper. – 2005. – October 12. – p. 7.
  "When you are Straightforward, Sincere, and GoodWilled, you Also Feel an Admiration of Surrounding you People" (in Azeri) / X. Ahmadov, Z. Aliyeva // "Geopolitika" newspaper. – 2007. – No 38. – p. 12.
  Isayev (Isakhanli) Hamlet Abdulla (in English and Russian) / M.B. Babayev // Azerbaijan Mathematicians XX Century. – Baku: Oka Ofset, 2007. – p. 77.
  Mecidoglu Kh. The Beloved One of the God (in Azeri) // Khazar View. – 2008. – January 1 (No 242). – p. 8-11.
  Mecidoglu Kh. About my friend (in Azeri) // 525-ci qazet– December 20, 2008. – (No. 235). – p. 26.
  Mecidoglu Kh. If We don't Pass From Aspirations to Deeds/ Our Hopes will Vanish and Become in Vain (in Azeri) // Khazar View. – 2008. – March 1 (No 246). – p. 7-9.
  Nazarli T. The Way Taking its Start From the Com¬mand of Soul (in Azeri) // Azerbaijan. – 2008. – March 19 (No 61).
Also // Khazar View. – 2008. – 01 aprel (No 248). – p. 14-16.

External links 
 Homepage of Hamlet Isakhanli (in English, in Azeri, in Russian, and in German)
 Khazar Universitya research-oriented university (in English and in Azeri)
 Khazar University Institutional Repository (KUIR)

Soviet mathematicians
20th-century Azerbaijani mathematicians
Mathematical analysts
20th-century Azerbaijani poets
Azerbaijani translators
Translators to Azerbaijani
Translators from Azerbaijani
Translators from English
Translators from Russian
Translators from French
Translation scholars
Education writers
Azerbaijani educational theorists
Linguists from Azerbaijan
Lexicographers
University and college founders
Heads of universities and colleges in Azerbaijan
People from Gardabani
Georgian Azerbaijanis
Living people
1948 births
Academic staff of Khazar University
20th-century translators
21st-century Azerbaijani poets
Azerbaijani male poets